Walter Gerhardt "Pee Wee" Hunt (May 10, 1907 – June 22, 1979) was an American jazz trombonist, vocalist, and bandleader.
Hunt was born in Mount Healthy, Ohio. He developed a musical interest at an early age, as his mother, Sadie, played the banjo and his father, Edgar C., played violin. He had a younger sister, Marian, and younger brother, Raymond. The teenage Hunt was a banjoist with a local band while he was attending college at Ohio State University, where he majored in Electrical Engineering, and during his college years he switched from banjo to trombone. He graduated from the Cincinnati Conservatory of Music. He joined Jean Goldkette's Orchestra in 1928.

Hunt was the co-founder and featured trombonist with the Casa Loma Orchestra, but he left the group in 1943 to work as a Hollywood radio disc jockey, before joining the Merchant Marine near the end of World War II. He returned to the West Coast music scene in 1946. His "Twelfth Street Rag" was a three million-selling, number one hit in September 1948. He was satirized as Pee Wee Runt and his All-Flea Dixieland Band in Tex Avery's animated MGM cartoon Dixieland Droopy (1954). His second major hit was "Oh!" (1953), his second million-selling disc, which reached number three in the Billboard chart.

At age 72, Hunt died after a long illness in Plymouth, Massachusetts. Hunt and his wife, Ruth, had a daughter, Holly, and a son, Lawrence.

References

External links
 Famous King players: Pee Wee Hunt
[ Allmusic]
Outlet.historicimages.com : 1959 Press Photo Pee Wee Hunt
 Pee Wee Hunt recordings at the Discography of American Historical Recordings.

American jazz trombonists
Male trombonists
Capitol Records artists
1907 births
1979 deaths
People from Plymouth, Massachusetts
Ohio State University College of Engineering alumni
20th-century American musicians
20th-century trombonists
People from Mount Healthy, Ohio
Jazz musicians from Massachusetts
Jazz musicians from Ohio
20th-century American male musicians
American male jazz musicians
Casa Loma Orchestra members